Neplachovice is a municipality and village in Opava District in the Moravian-Silesian Region of the Czech Republic. It has about 900 inhabitants.

Administrative parts
The village of Zadky is an administrative part of Neplachovice.

History
The first written mention of Neplachovice is from 1257.

Notable people
Alfred Schreiber (1923–1944), German fighter pilot

References

External links

Villages in Opava District